The  is an electric multiple unit (EMU) type operated by the private railway operator Nagoya Railroad (Meitetsu) in Japan since 1988. The trains consist of two limited express style 1000 series (or 1030 series) cars and four commuter style 1200 series (or 1230 series) cars.

Formations
, the fleet consists of 12 six-car 1000/1200 series sets and three six-car 1030/1230 series sets, formed as follows. Four-car 1000 series sets formed of only limited express style cars also previously operated.

1000/1200 series sets 1011-1016

 Cars 2, 3, and 5 each have one lozenge-type pantograph.
 Car 3 has a toilet.
 Car 4 is designated as a mildly air-conditioned car.

1000/1200 series sets 1111-1116

 Cars 2, 3, and 5 each have one lozenge-type pantograph.
 Car 2 has a toilet.
 Car 4 is designated as a mildly air-conditioned car.

1030/1230 series sets 1131-1133

 Cars 2, 4, and 6 each have one lozenge-type pantograph.
 Car 2 has a toilet.
 Car 4 is designated as a mildly air-conditioned car.

Original 1000 series 4-car sets

The original four-car 1000 series sets were formed as follows. These were removed from regular service in December 2008, and all withdrawn by April 2009.

 Cars 2 and 3 each had one lozenge-type pantograph.

Interior

History
The 1000 series trains were first introduced in 1988, as four-car sets formed entirely of limited express style cars. Between 1991 and 1992, six of the four-car sets (1011 to 1016) were split up and combined with four 1200 series commuter style cars to create new six-car 1000/1200 series mixed sets.

In 1992, four more six-car sets were built, reusing electrical equipment from withdrawn 7500 series "Panorama Car" EMU cars, and classified 1030/1230 series. These sets differed from the earlier 1000/1200 series trainsets in having all cars motored. Set 1134 was converted to become a four-car 1380 series commuter set in 2002 after the limited express (1030 series) cars sustained collision damage and had to be scrapped.

From 2015, the designation for the trains was standardized to simply "1200 series".

Withdrawal
The remaining four-car sets were removed from regular service from the start of the timetable revision on 27 December 2008. Set 1001 was used on a special farewell run on 18 April 2009. Some of the electrical equipment from these sets being reused in 5000 series commuter EMUs.

Refurbishment
From fiscal 2015, three 6-car 1200 series sets (18 vehicles) are scheduled to be refurbished with new interiors and exterior livery. The first set treated, 1112, was unveiled in August 2015. Refurbishment work includes replacing the original "Panorama Super" headboard panel with a colour LED destination indicator, and a new livery similar to that carried by the 2200 series trains.

References

External links

 Meitetsu 1000/1030 series information 
 Meitetsu 1200/1230 series information 

Electric multiple units of Japan
1200 series
Train-related introductions in 1988
Nippon Sharyo multiple units
1500 V DC multiple units of Japan